Ladan Mostofi (born 17 November 1972) is an Iranian actress. She has received various accolades, including nominations for three Crystal Simorgh, two Hafez Awards and an Iran Cinema Celebration Awards. She won the Best Actress Award at the 3rd Eurasia International Film Festival for Goodnight Commander (2006).

Filmography

Film

Television

Web

See also 
 Persian cinema

References

External links 

 instagram

20th-century Iranian actresses
1972 births
Living people
People from Mazandaran Province
People from Tonekabon